The Port and Helen McWhorter House, located at 426 N. Broadway in Miller in Hand County, South Dakota, was built in 1906.  It was listed on the National Register of Historic Places in 2017.

It is a two-story, wood-frame, Queen Anne style house which was built for Dr. Port and Helen McWhorter. The first floor was used for medical offices and the upper floor as a residence.  It was used as a public school dormitory around 1938, and it became a museum in 1989.   It was deemed notable "for its association with the health/medical history of Miller" and "as an excellent local example of early twentieth century Queen Anne (cross gable, free classic) architecture."

It is a museum of the Hand County Historic Society.

References

Houses on the National Register of Historic Places in South Dakota
Queen Anne architecture in South Dakota
Houses completed in 1906
Hand County, South Dakota
Museums in Hand County, South Dakota
1906 establishments in South Dakota